Richard J. Watson (born 1946) is an American artist. He was born in Badin, North Carolina. He attended the Pennsylvania Academy of the Fine Arts. In the 1970s he collaborated with Walter Edmonds to create murals for the Church of the Advocate in Philadelphia. The  Church of the Advocate was a center of activity for the civil rights movement in North Philadelphia. the church commissioned Edmonds and Watson to paint murals for the interior of the church.  They were requested to portray a combination of Black history and themes from the bible. The two artists were active in the Church of the Advocate and they donated their time to create the murals. 14 murals were completed from 1973 through 1976 . Titles include "Creation", "I Have a Dream", "The Lord smote the firstborn in the land of Egypt", and "God has chosen the weak to confound the strong". 

Watson's work was included in the 2015 exhibition We Speak: Black Artists in Philadelphia, 1920s–1970s at the Woodmere Art Museum. In 2021 the African American Museum in Philadelphia held an exhibition of his work entitled Portals+Revelations – Richard J. Watson Beyond Realities.

His work is in the Pennsylvania Academy of the Fine Arts and the Petrucci Family Foundation.

References

External links
 Interview with Richard J. Watson for "Philadelphia's 100 History Makers of the 20th Century"

1946 births
Living people
Artists from Philadelphia
American male artists